Myristoylated alanine-rich C-kinase substrate is a protein that in humans is encoded by the MARCKS gene.
It plays important roles in cell shape, cell motility, secretion, transmembrane transport, regulation of the cell cycle, and neural development.  Recently, MARCKS has been implicated in the exocytosis of a number of vesicles and granules such as mucin and chromaffin.
It is also the name of a protein family, of which MARCKS is the most studied member. They are intrinsically disordered proteins, with an acidic pH, with high proportions of alanine, glycine, proline, and glutamic acid. They are membrane-bound through a lipid anchor at the N-terminus, and a polybasic domain in the middle. They are regulated by Ca2+/calmodulin and protein kinase C. In their unphosphorylated form, they bind to actin filaments, causing them to crosslink, and sequester acidic membrane phospholipids such as PIP2.

The protein encoded by this gene is a substrate for protein kinase C. It is localized to the plasma membrane and is an actin filament crosslinking protein. Phosphorylation by protein kinase C or binding to calcium-calmodulin inhibits its association with actin and with the plasma membrane, leading to its presence in the cytoplasm. The protein is thought to be involved in cell motility, phagocytosis, membrane trafficking and mitogenesis.

Interactions 

MARCKS has been shown to interact with TOB1 and with NMT2.

References

Further reading